Ludwig Karl Heinrich Freiherr von der Pfordten (11 September 1811 in Ried (Innkreis) – 18 August 1880 in Munich) was a Bavarian attorney and politician.

Biography 
Von der Pfordten studied law at the University of Heidelberg and Erlangen. In 1833 he became a professor in Würzburg. In 1843 he moved to the University of Leipzig; from 1845 he served as its president and became a leader of the Saxon Liberal Party. In March 1848 he was appointed Saxon Interior Minister and Education Minister under Prime Minister Karl Braun. When Braun resigned in February 1849, von der Pfordten returned to Bavaria and was appointed Minister-President of Bavaria and Foreign Minister by King Maximilian II of Bavaria.

His project was to unite the German middle-sized powers under Bavarian leadership against Prussia and Austria as a "Third Germany" (the so-called Trias). Thus, he was partly responsible that Bavaria in actuality torpedoed the project of the Erfurt Union. After an agreement between Austria and Prussia was reached with the Punctation of Olmütz in December 1850, the trias concept lost most of its importance in the subsequent few years and von der Pfordten resigned in 1859. He then was the Bavarian envoy for the Frankfurt Parliament.

In 1864 von der Pfordten returned to power when King Ludwig II of Bavaria restored him. He resigned again in December 1866, since his placement efforts had failed and Bavaria had lost the Austro-Prussian War as an ally of Austria.

Orders and decorations 
 :
 Grand Cross of the Royal Merit Order of the Bavarian Crown, 1849
 Knight of the Royal Order of Saint Hubert, 1866
 :
 Grand Cross of the Friedrich Order, 1850
 Grand Cross of the Order of the Württemberg Crown, 1854
  Electorate of Hesse: Knight of the House Order of the Golden Lion, 20 February 1851
 : Grand Cross of the Grand Ducal Hessian Order of Ludwig, 9 August 1853
  Kingdom of Prussia: Knight of the Order of the Red Eagle, 1st Class, 14 August 1854

References 

People from the Kingdom of Bavaria
Ministers-President of Bavaria
Members of the Bavarian Chamber of Deputies
Barons of Germany
1811 births
1880 deaths